99% is the third studio album by British electronic music group Meat Beat Manifesto. The album peaked at No. 6 on the CMJ Radio Top 150.

Critical reception

The Washington Post wrote that "these 10 tracks employ some obnoxious samples and plenty of metallic wallop, but the ultimate effect is almost seamless."

Track listing

Personnel 
 Jack Dangers
 Jonny Stephens
 Greg Retch
 Craig Morrison - cover art

References 

Meat Beat Manifesto albums
1990 albums
Mute Records albums
Albums produced by Jack Dangers